The 1937 Wake Forest Demon Deacons football team was an American football team that represented Wake Forest University during the 1937 college football season. In its first season under head coach Peahead Walker, the team compiled a 3–6 record and finished in 14th place in the Southern Conference.

Schedule

References

Wake Forest
Wake Forest Demon Deacons football seasons
Wake Forest Demon Deacons football